Sadhan Kumar Adhikari is a Brazilian-Indian professor of physics, since 1991, at the Institute of Theoretical Physics (IFT) of the  São Paulo State University (UNESP).

Early life
Sadhan Kumar Adhikari was born to Nalini Ranjan and Mira Adhikari on 2 January 1948 in Kharagpore, India. In 1962 he graduated from Hindu School, Kolkata and then joined the Bachelor of Science program at the Presidency University, Kolkata which he finished with honours by 1965. The same year he started the Master of Science course at the University of Calcutta which he completed by 1968. For a year he was a post-M.Sc fellow at the Saha Institute of Nuclear Physics, India and in 1973 obtained PhD in physics from the University of Pennsylvania, USA. From 1973 to 1976 worked at the University of New South Wales, Australia as a post-doc scholar and since 1976 till 1991 was an associate professor at the Federal University of Pernambuco, Brazil.

Research
He contributed to the area of few-body scattering in nuclear and atomic physics, 

renormalization in nonrelativistic quantum mechanics, and the physics of cold atoms and superfluids. He formulated the quantum scattering theory in two dimensions using  Lippmann–Schwinger equations and the asymptotic wave function for scattering. From 2002 to 2009 he used Gross–Pitaevskii equation to study  the formation of bright solitons in a  Bose–Einstein condensate using  FORTRAN 77 programs. 
He, in collaboration with P. Muruganandam and Antun Balaž, and colleagues from the Institute of Physics, Scientific Computing Laboratory, Belgrade wrote popular Fortran and C programs to solve the Gross–Pitaevskii equation and study properties of Bose–Einstein condensates using the Crank–Nicolson method. He is the author of two books on scattering theory published by Academic Press, San Francisco, Hard cover (1988), Paperback (2012) and eTextbook (2012) and by John Wiley & Sons, New York (1998). According to Webofscience he published more than 300 research articles with more than 6000 citations (H factor=39).

Awards
Dr. Adhikari is a Graduate fellow of the University of Pennsylvania (1970), and a Fellow of the  John Simon Guggenheim Memorial Foundation (1996).

References

External links

1948 births
Living people
Academic staff of the Federal University of Pernambuco
Academic staff of the University of New South Wales
United States National Science Foundation officials
University of Pennsylvania fellows
Academic staff of the São Paulo State University
Brazilian people of Indian descent